Mark Robert Michael Wahlberg (born June 5, 1971), former stage name Marky Mark, is an American actor, businessman, and former rapper. His work as a leading man spans the comedy, drama, and action genres. He has received multiple accolades, including a BAFTA Award, and nominations for two Academy Awards, three Golden Globe Awards, nine Primetime Emmy Awards, and three Screen Actors Guild Awards.

Wahlberg was born in Boston, Massachusetts in 1971. During his early life, he perpetrated several crimes. In the 1990s, Wahlberg was a member of the music group Marky Mark and the Funky Bunch, with whom he released the albums Music for the People (1991) and You Gotta Believe (1992). Wahlberg made his screen debut in Renaissance Man (1994) and had his first starring role in Fear (1996). He received critical praise for his performance as porn actor Dirk Diggler in Boogie Nights (1997).

In the early 2000s, he ventured into big-budget action movies, such as The Perfect Storm (2000), Planet of the Apes (2001), and The Italian Job (2003). He was nominated for the Academy Award for Best Supporting Actor for playing a police officer in the crime drama The Departed (2006). He was nominated for the Golden Globe Award for Best Actor for the sports drama biopic The Fighter (2010), in which he starred as Micky Ward. In the 2010s, he landed successful comedy roles with The Other Guys (2010), Ted (2012), Ted 2 (2015), Daddy's Home (2015), and Daddy's Home 2 (2017). He also became the protagonist in two films in the Transformers live-action film franchise, Transformers: Age of Extinction and Transformers: The Last Knight. He was the world's highest-paid actor in 2017.

Wahlberg served as executive producer of five HBO series: the comedy-drama Entourage (2004–2011), the period crime drama Boardwalk Empire (2010–2014), the comedy-dramas How to Make It in America (2010–2011) and Ballers (2015–2019), and the documentary McMillions (2020). He is co-owner of the Wahlburgers chain and co-starred in the reality TV series about it. He received a star on the Hollywood Walk of Fame in 2010.

Early life and family
Mark Robert Michael Wahlberg was born on June 5, 1971, in the Dorchester neighborhood of Boston, Massachusetts. He is the youngest of nine children, including actor Robert and singer/actor Donnie. His mother, Alma Elaine (née Donnelly; 1942–2021), was a bank clerk and a nurse's aide, and his father, Donald Edmond Wahlberg Sr. (1930–2008), was a delivery driver and U.S. Army veteran of the Korean War. Wahlberg's parents divorced in 1982; afterward, he divided his time between them.

Wahlberg is of Swedish descent through his father, and of Irish descent through his paternal grandmother. His mother was of Irish, English and French-Canadian ancestry. On his mother's side of the family, he is distantly related to author Nathaniel Hawthorne. Wahlberg was raised Catholic, and attended Copley Square High School on Newbury Street in Boston. By age 13, he had developed an addiction to cocaine and other substances; he did not receive his high school diploma until June 2013, at the age of 42.

Legal issues 
In June 1986, a 15-year-old Wahlberg and three friends chased after three black children while yelling "Kill the nigger, kill the nigger" and throwing rocks at them. The next day, Wahlberg and the others followed a group of mostly black fourth-graders (including one of the victims from the previous day) taking a field trip on a beach, yelled racial epithets, threw rocks at them, and "summoned other white males who joined" in the harassment. In August 1986, civil action was filed against Wahlberg for violating the civil rights of his victims, and the case was settled the next month.

Wahlberg perpetrated another racist assault in April 1988. Then 16, he assaulted a middle-aged Vietnamese-American man on the street, calling him a "Vietnam fucking shit" and knocking him unconscious with a large wooden stick. Later the same day, Wahlberg attacked Johnny Trinh, another Vietnamese-American, punching him in the eye. When Wahlberg was arrested and returned to the scene of the first assault, he told police officers: "I'll tell you now that's the mother-fucker whose head I split open." Later, Wahlberg would explain that he was on PCP at the time. Investigators also noted that Wahlberg "made numerous unsolicited racial statements about 'gooks' and 'slant-eyed gooks. Wahlberg was charged with attempted murder, pleaded guilty to felony assault, and was sentenced to two years in jail, but served only 45 days of his sentence. Wahlberg believed he had left the second victim permanently blind in one eye, though Trinh later said that he had lost his eye during the Vietnam War while serving in the South Vietnamese army, which fought alongside American forces.

In August 1992, Wahlberg fractured the jaw of his neighbor Robert Crehan in an attack. Court documents state that in 1992, Wahlberg, "without provocation or cause, viciously and repeatedly kicked" Crehan in the face, while another man, Derek McCall, held the victim on the ground. Wahlberg's attorney claimed that Wahlberg and McCall, who is black, were provoked after McCall was called a racial slur by Crehan. The lawsuit was settled between the two parties, avoiding a criminal trial.

In 2006, Wahlberg said the right thing for him to do would be to meet with Trinh and make amends, though he had not done so. In 2016, while requesting a pardon for his conviction for the assault on Trinh, Wahlberg said he had met with Trinh and apologized "for those horrific acts." Trinh released a public statement forgiving Wahlberg.

In 2014, Wahlberg applied for a pardon from the State of Massachusetts for his convictions. His pardon application engendered controversy. According to the BBC, the debate about his suitability for a pardon raised "difficult issues, with the arguments on both sides being far-reaching and complex". One individual attacked by Wahlberg when she was a child opposed the pardon, saying: "a racist will always be a racist." Judith Beals, who had been the prosecutor in some of the cases, argued that "Wahlberg has never acknowledged the racial nature of his crimes" and that pardoning Wahlberg would undermine his charity work, saying: "a formal public pardon would highlight all too clearly that if you are white and a movie star, a different standard applies. Is that really what Wahlberg wants?"

In 2016, Wahlberg said he regretted his attempt to obtain a pardon, and his petition was closed after he failed to answer a request from the pardon board as to whether he wanted it to remain open.

Career

Music

Wahlberg first came to fame as the younger brother of Donnie Wahlberg of the successful boy band New Kids on the Block. Mark, at age 13, was one of the group's original members, along with Donnie, but quit after a few months. Danny Wood, Jordan Knight, Jonathan Knight and Joey McIntyre all joined the group after Mark had left.

In 1990, Wahlberg began recording with dancers/rappers Scott Ross (Scottie Gee), Hector Barros (Hector the Booty Inspector), Anthony Thomas (Ashley Ace), and Terry Yancey (DJ-T) as Marky Mark and the Funky Bunch, earning a hit with "Good Vibrations" from their debut album Music for the People. The record, produced by brother Donnie, hit number one on the Billboard Hot 100, later becoming certified as a platinum single. The second single, "Wildside", peaked at number five on Billboards Hot Singles Sales chart and at number 10 on the Billboard Hot 100. It was certified as a gold single. Marky Mark opened for the New Kids on the Block during their last tour. Marky Mark and the Funky Bunch also had their own video game, titled Marky Mark and the Funky Bunch: Make My Video, which despite the band's success, was a huge flop. The second Marky Mark and the Funky Bunch LP, You Gotta Believe, was not as successful as the first, yielding only a minor hit single in the title track.

In December 1992, while performing on the British TV show The Word, Wahlberg praised Shabba Ranks, who had stated gay people should be crucified. GLAAD condemned him and berated Calvin Klein for using him to promote their products. A self-titled autobiographical picture book, Marky Mark, with images taken by Lynn Goldsmith and statements mostly by him, was also released. Trying to resuscitate his music career, he had shifted to Hamburg, where he was produced under the label of East West Records by Frank Peterson and Alex Christensen.

Wahlberg later collaborated with the late reggae/ragga singer Prince Ital Joe on the album Life in the Streets. The project combined rap vocals, electronic-infused ragga, and "European dancefloor" music, delivering the singles "Happy People", German number one hit "United", "Life in the Streets", and "Babylon", with Peterson and Christensen as producers. Many of these tracks featured on the film Renaissance Man, starring Wahlberg and Danny Devito.

In 1995, he released a single titled "No Mercy", in support of his friend Dariusz Michalczewski, whom he had befriended earlier in the 1990s. Michalczewski also appears in the music video of the song. Wahlberg and Prince Ital Joe released another album in 1995 for Ultraphonic Records. Titled The Remix Album, it featured remixes from the duo's previous album, Life in the Streets, as well as Mark's solo track, "No Mercy".

After his album with Ital Joe became a hit in Germany, he started putting together a musical act called One Love with him as its producer and also sometimes its lead singer. He also started production on a third studio album. He featured in their song titled "That's the Way I Like It". In 1996, Wahlberg returned to Hamburg to record a solo single titled "Hey DJ" with producer Toni Cottura. Two more solo tracks titled "Feel the Vibe" and "Best of My Love" were released in 1997.

In 2000, he was featured in the Black Label Society music video for "Counterfeit God", as a stand-in for the band's bassist.

Advertising
Wahlberg first displayed his physique in the "Good Vibrations" music video and most prominently in a series of underwear ads for Calvin Klein (1992) shot by Herb Ritts, following it with Calvin Klein television advertisements. Magazine and television promotions sometimes featured Wahlberg exclusively or accompanied by model Kate Moss. Annie Leibovitz also shot a famous session of Wahlberg in underwear for Vanity Fair's annual Hall of Fame issue. He also made a workout video titled The Marky Mark Workout: Form... Focus... Fitness.

In 2012, Wahlberg began serving as a brand ambassador for Marked, a line of sports nutrition supplements by GNC.

In March 2017, AT&T announced that Wahlberg would become a spokesman and he would create original content for the mobile network division. The deal reportedly paid Wahlberg more than $10 million.

Film 

In 1993, Wahlberg made his acting debut in the television film The Substitute. After this appearance, he dropped the "Marky Mark" name. His big screen debut came the next year, with the Danny DeVito feature Renaissance Man. A basketball fanatic, he caught the attention of critics after appearing alongside Leonardo DiCaprio in The Basketball Diaries (1995), a film adaptation of the Jim Carroll book of the same name, playing the role of Mickey. He had his first starring role in James Foley's thriller film Fear (1996).

He earned positive reviews after films such as Boogie Nights, Three Kings, The Perfect Storm, and Four Brothers. During the early 2000s, Wahlberg appeared in remakes of 1960s films such as Planet of the Apes, The Truth About Charlie (a remake of the 1963 film Charade), and The Italian Job. His performance in I Heart Huckabees was voted the best supporting performance of the year in the 2004 The Village Voice Critics Poll. Wahlberg was originally cast as Linus Caldwell in Ocean's Eleven, but Matt Damon played the role instead. The two later worked together in The Departed. Wahlberg was also considered for a role in the film Brokeback Mountain. It was originally intended to star Wahlberg and Joaquin Phoenix (with whom he appeared in the 2000 film The Yards) as Ennis Del Mar and Jack Twist, respectively, but both actors were uncomfortable with the film's sex scenes. The roles ultimately went to Heath Ledger and Jake Gyllenhaal, both of whom were nominated for Academy Awards for their performances.

Wahlberg starred in the American football drama Invincible, based on the true story of bartender Vince Papale. He was also the executive producer of the HBO series Entourage (2004–2011), which was loosely based on his experiences in Hollywood. In 2006, he appeared as Sean Dignam, an unpleasant, foul-mouthed Massachusetts State Police staff sergeant in Martin Scorsese's critically acclaimed thriller, The Departed, which netted him an Academy Award nomination for Best Supporting Actor, a Golden Globe nomination for Best Performance by an Actor in a Supporting Role in a Motion Picture, and a National Society of Film Critics Best Supporting Actor award. Wahlberg was reunited with his The Basketball Diaries co-star Leonardo DiCaprio.

Despite his felony conviction, which legally prohibits him from handling firearms, Wahlberg prepared for his role in Shooter by attending long-range shooting training at Front Sight Firearms Training Institute near Pahrump, Nevada. He was able to hit a target at 1,100 yards on his second day, a feat which usually takes weeks to achieve. He had said in a number of interviews that he would retire at the age of 40 to concentrate on parenthood and professional golf. However, in early 2007, he indicated that the latter was no longer the plan as "his golf game is horrible". He played Jack Salmon, the father of the protagonist, Susie, in Peter Jackson's The Lovely Bones, a film adaptation of the Alice Sebold book of the same name. In 2007, he starred opposite Joaquin Phoenix in We Own the Night, a movie about a family of police officers in New York City.

He starred in M. Night Shyamalan's The Happening as Eliot Moore, which premiered in movie theaters on June 13, 2008. The same year, he played the title role in Max Payne, based on the video game of the same name. While promoting Max Payne, Wahlberg became involved in a playful feud with The Lonely Island's Andy Samberg. Samberg had done an impression of Wahlberg in a Saturday Night Live sketch titled "Mark Wahlberg Talks to Animals". Wahlberg later appeared in a follow-up sketch parodying the original one, Samberg's impression of Wahlberg, and his own threats to Samberg.

In 2012, Wahlberg starred in Seth MacFarlane's hit comedy Ted, reprising the same role in its 2015 sequel. Wahlberg later starred as Navy SEAL Marcus Luttrell in the war film Lone Survivor (2013), based on Luttrell's 2007 book of the same name. The film received commercial success and mostly positive reviews, and Wahlberg's performance was highly praised. In 2014, Wahlberg starred in the remake of The Gambler, the 1974 James Caan film that was loosely inspired by the Dostoyevsky novella. In 2014, Wahlberg was the producer of the reality show Breaking Boston, which was pulled off the air after its premiere had 311,000 viewers. He executive-produced one episode of Wahlburgers, while co-starring in it. In 2015, he starred opposite Will Ferrell in the comedy Daddy's Home. In 2016, he starred in two Peter Berg films, Deepwater Horizon, a film about the 2010 Deepwater Horizon oil spill, and Patriots Day, a film about the 2013 Boston Marathon bombing.

Wahlberg topped the list of the world's highest-paid actors in 2017. In 2018, his salary of $1.5 million for the reshoots for All the Money in the World stirred a gender pay gap controversy, as his co-star Michelle Williams had received less than $1,000 for the same reshoots. Wahlberg donated the money to the Time's Up initiative, a movement against sexual harassment co-founded by Williams.

Wahlberg produced and starred in the espionage film Mile 22 (2018), and appeared in the Netflix film Spenser Confidential (2020), and the animated movie Scoob! (2020), which was his first voice acting role. In 2022, Wahlberg starred in the Uncharted film, as Victor Sullivan, having originally been cast to play Nathan Drake years prior.

Business interests
Wahlberg is a co-owner of Wahlburgers, along with his brothers Donnie and Paul. It was Mark's idea to expand Paul's restaurant in Hingham, Massachusetts into a full-fledged chain, with a reality show to promote it.

In July 2013, Wahlberg bought an equity interest of the Barbados Tridents cricket team. Wahlberg was introduced to the game by his friend Ajmal Khan, the club's chairman and Caribbean Premier League founder. Following the announcement, Wahlberg stated, "I am a huge cricket fan now. I'm excited to be a part of the Limacol Caribbean Premier League because I know cricket is huge in the Caribbean and a rich part of the region's heritage. Sports and entertainment are a powerful combination, and the LCPL will appeal to a huge audience worldwide."

In 2015, Wahlberg recruited rapper Sean Combs and billionaire Ronald Burkle to join him in investing in Aquahydrate, a bottled water brand Wahlberg discovered. Together, the three men own a majority stake in the company. Wahlberg, together with former GNC executive Tom Dowd, co-founded Performance Inspired, a sports nutrition company launched in 2016. In February 2017, Wahlberg was one of the investors who took part in a $6 million funding round for StockX, a sneaker resale marketplace. In March 2019, Wahlberg bought a stake in the F45 fitness franchise.

On July 20, 2018, Wahlberg and his business partner, Jay Feldman, announced the purchase of Bobby Layman Chevrolet in Columbus, Ohio. The dealership was renamed Mark Wahlberg Chevrolet. Due to the success of the dealership, local ABC affiliate WSYX reported in March 2020 that Haydocy Buick-GMC, right across the street from Mark Wahlberg Chevrolet, had filed paperwork with Ohio Secretary of State Frank LaRose to rename itself Mark Wahlberg Buick-GMC; Feldman later confirmed that he and Wahlberg were purchasing their second General Motors dealership in the city. The deal became official on June 29, 2020, and also included Haydocy's Airstream and RV dealership, located next door at the car dealership's former Oldsmobile showroom. Shortly afterward, Wahlberg and Feldman announced they were purchasing Jack Maxton Chevrolet in nearby Worthington, Ohio, their fourth Columbus-area dealership, with plans to rename it Mark Wahlberg Chevrolet of Worthington. A fifth dealership, Mark Wahlberg Chevrolet of Avon, was added in Avon, Ohio in July 2021; unlike the other dealerships, the Avon location is in Greater Cleveland, marking Wahlberg and Feldman's entry into Northeast Ohio.

In 2021, Wahlberg, along with his producing partner/manager Stephen Levinson, launched Ballers Report, an online platform (and spin-off of their HBO series Ballers) that features inspiring business, entertainment and sports articles, videos and podcasts.

In 2021, he invested in the Tequila brand Flecha Azul.

Personal life
Wahlberg started dating Rhea Durham in 2001. They had three children during the first seven years of their relationship, and married on August 1, 2009, at the Good Shepherd Catholic Church in Beverly Hills, near where they live. They had another child five months after their wedding in January 2010.

Wahlberg was booked to fly on American Airlines Flight 11 on September 11, 2001, but his plans changed the day before and he canceled his reservation. He received backlash for stating in a 2012 interview, "If I was on that plane with my kids, it wouldn't have went down like it did". He added that "there would have been a lot of blood in that first-class cabin and then me saying, 'OK, we're going to land somewhere safely, don't worry. He issued an apology after family members of those killed on the flight expressed outrage.

Wahlberg is Catholic, and has described his religion as "the most important part" of his life; he often goes to Mass twice on Sundays. He openly supports same-sex marriage despite the Church's opposition. In September 2015, he apologized to Pope Francis over the crude jokes he made in the film Ted, and he stated in an interview with Cardinal Blase Cupich of Chicago in 2017 that he sought forgiveness from God for playing a porn star in Boogie Nights. He later stated on Andy Cohen's radio show that the interview "was a joke taken too seriously." In 2023, Wahlberg stated that the Christian practices of fasting and prayer during the Lenten season were meaningful to him, as he discussed his Hallow Christian prayer app.

Wahlberg established the Mark Wahlberg Youth Foundation in May 2001 for the purpose of raising and distributing funds to youth service and enrichment programs. Wahlberg is active with The Good Shepherd Center for Homeless Women and Children.

Discography

Solo singles

Filmography

Awards and nominations

References

Further reading
 Reisfeld, Randi. Marky Mark and the Funky Bunch. New York: Avon Books, 1992. 
 Simpson, Mark. "Marky Mark and the Hunky [sic] Bunch: the Hustler Syndrome", in his Male Impersonators: Men Performing Masculinity (New York: Routledge, 1994), pp. [150]–163. N.B.: Wahlberg is also mentioned and discussed elsewhere (as "Marky Mark") in Simpson's book.

External links

 
 
 
 

 
1971 births
20th-century American male actors
20th-century Roman Catholics
21st-century American male actors
21st-century American rappers
21st-century Roman Catholics
American film producers
American hip hop musicians
American male film actors
American male rappers
American people convicted of assault
American people of English descent
American people of French-Canadian descent
American people of Irish descent
American people of Scandinavian descent
American people of Swedish descent
Television producers from Massachusetts
BAFTA winners (people)
Catholics from Massachusetts
Living people
Male actors from Boston
Massachusetts Democrats
New Kids on the Block members
Participants in American reality television series
People from Dorchester, Massachusetts
Wahlberg family